Pavličić is a surname. Notable people with the surname include:

Dubravko Pavličić (1967–2012), Croatian football player
Igor Pavličić (b. 1970), Serbian politician
Milan Pavličić (b. 1980), Croatian football player
Pavao Pavličić (b. 1946), Croatian writer, literary historian and translator
Tomislav Pavličić (b. 1983), Croatian football player

Croatian surnames